This is a list of American television-related events in 1962.

Events

Also in 1962 
The All-Channel Receiver Act of 1962 requires UHF (channels 14-83) tuners to be on all consumer television sets in addition to the VHF tuner. 
Zenith Electronics markets its first color television set, 21-inch round screen set.

Television programs

Debuts

Ending this year

Network launches

Television stations

Station launches

Network affiliation changes

Station closures

Births

Deaths

References

External links 
List of 1962 American television series at IMDb